Husnar is a village located in the Giddarbaha tehsil of Sri Muktsar Sahib district in Punjab, India. Most of the population is educated in this village.

Geography

The village is only 2 km from the nearest city and railway station, Giddarbaha and 264 km from the state capital city of Chandigarh. Buttar Bakhuha (4.5 km), Madhir (5 km), Bharu (3 km) are the surrounding villages.

Demographics

In 2001, according to the census, the village had the total population of 4,845 with 819 households, 2525 males and 2320 females.
Thus males constitutes 52% and females 48% of the population with the sex ratio of 919 females per thousand males.

Culture

Husnar is predominated by the Jatt people of Brar and Sidhu communities. The other Jatt minorities includes, Gills, Vehniwals and Dhillons. The OBCs are mostly Tarkhans of Khatri community and Ghumiars and the SCs includes Mazhabis and Chamars mainly.

Punjabi is the mother tongue as well as the official language of the village.

Religion

The villagers are mainly Sikhs, with Hindu minorities, and follows Sikhism. The village have two beautiful newly constructed Gurudwaras as the main religious sites.

Gurudwara Nanaksar Sahib located in the middle of the village.

A Dera, Dera Baba Ganga Ram Ji is also a place of religious respect in the memory of Baba Ganga Ram Ji, a very honored Sant of the area. There is a Dera in the memory of the same Sant in the nearest city of Giddarbaha also. People have great respect for Baba Sidh, a regarded Sant and the main person of the local Gaushala few years ago. A statue of the Sant is located in the Gaushala.

Education & Sports

The village has a Govt. Primary School (near Gurudwara Nanaksar Sahib), Govt. High School (on Husnar-Giddarbaha road), two Anganwari center and some private schools. The students goes to Giddarbaha, Bathinda and Malout for higher education.

The village have a Gaushala (a place for cows), water works, an R.O. Plant and very good bus services to the surroundings.

Sports

The village has good sports activities. Kabaddi, Cricket and Volleyball are the main games played every evening. There are two sports clubs and the sports stadium is under construction near the water works.

Economy
Being a village of Punjab, agriculture is the main occupation of the villagers and the main source of income as well. Wheat, Cotton and Rice are the main crops. A plastic-bottle factory and many rice mills on the outskirts are the main employers.

References

Villages in Sri Muktsar Sahib district
Sri Muktsar Sahib district